Maria Teresa Schutzmann (born 21 July 1979) is an Italian retired female sprinter, which participated at the 2003 World Championships in Athletics.

Achievements

References

External links
 

1979 births
Living people
Italian female sprinters
World Athletics Championships athletes for Italy